Irene Bustamante Adams (born 1968,  Hanford, California) is an American politician and a Democratic member of the Nevada Assembly since February 7, 2011 representing District 42.

Education

Irene Bustamante earned her BS from California State University, Fresno and her EMBA from University of Nevada, Las Vegas.

She married Brad Adams; the couple has two daughters.

Elections
2012: Bustamante Adams won the June 12, 2012 Democratic Primary with 1,073 votes (77.98%), and won the November 6, 2012 General election with 11,182 votes (67.06%) against Republican nominee Robert McEntee.
2010: When Democratic Assemblyman Harry Mortenson retired from the Assembly when he was term limited and left the House District 42 seat open, Bustamante Adams won the four-way June 8, 2010 Democratic Primary with 965 votes (64.81%), and won the November 2, 2010 General election with 5,629 votes (63.75%) against Republican nominee Kathryn Njus.

References

External links
Official page at the Nevada Legislature
Campaign site
 

1968 births
21st-century American politicians
21st-century American women politicians
California State University, Fresno alumni
Date of birth missing (living people)
Hispanic and Latino American state legislators in Nevada
Hispanic and Latino American women in politics
Living people
Democratic Party members of the Nevada Assembly
People from Hanford, California
People from the Las Vegas Valley
University of Nevada, Las Vegas alumni
Women state legislators in Nevada